Villa Alegre (Happy Village) is a children's television show and the first national bilingual (Spanish/English) program in the United States.  It was produced by Bilingual Children's Television as its inaugural project on the company's founding in 1970. Villa Alegre debuted on Public Broadcasting Service (PBS) public television in 1973 and ran there until funding disputes ended the project in 1981.  The show was also seen in syndication on commercial stations in some markets, on at least a weekly basis.

Villa Alegre was the creation of Dr. Rene Cardenas, who served as president of Bilingual Children's Television and Executive Producer. Other producers included Moctesuma Esparza, who worked on only the first season, and David Ochoa. 

The show won a Peabody Award among other honors.

Description 

Villa Alegre centered on life in a whimsical bilingual (Spanish and English) village. The program had an upbeat, catchy salsa-flavored theme song, which ended with adults and kids shouting "¡Villa Alegre!" The educational series was designed to teach English to Latino kids and Spanish to Anglo children.  It featured various educational subjects (such as mathematics and science) and life lessons, in addition to Hispanic culture.  The executive producer was Claudio Guzman and the head writer was Barbara Chain.  Her son Michael Chain was a staff writer who also composed much of the specialty music for the episodes.

Performers 

Kenia Hernandez Cueto played the child actress/singer Maria. Actress Carmen Zapata starred in the program for nine seasons in the role of Doña Luz, the mayor of Villa Alegre, Mexican-American singer-actress Marisela appeared on the show in her youth. Actress Linda Dangcil played Elena on the show. The show was directed by Argentine actor and director Alejandro Rey (who co-starred with Dangcil on The Flying Nun). Nono Arsu played Felipe  in the first and second seasons. Steve Franken and Hal Smith were regulars also.  Darryl Henriques played Mimo in the first and second seasons.

Notes

External links 

 
 Villa Alegre on Facebook
 Villa Alegre at Big Cartel

PBS original programming
American television shows featuring puppetry
Spanish-language television programming in the United States
Spanish-language education television programming
1970s American children's television series
1980s American children's television series
1973 American television series debuts
1980 American television series endings
American children's education television series